El Rahmaniya (also spelled as Rahmanieh) is a city in Beheira Governorate, Egypt.

History
The old name of the city is Mahallet Abd al-Rahman.

After the arrival of the French campaign to the west of Alexandria on July 2, 1798 AD, they marched into the city and occupied it on that day. After that, Napoleon took a march on Cairo through Damanhur, where he was able to occupy the city of Rosetta on 6 July and reached Rahmaniya, a village on the Nile. In the meantime, the Mamluks were preparing an army to confront the French armies, led by Murad Bey.

However, the Mamluk army was defeated and was forced to retreat. Murad Bey returned to Cairo and met both the French and Mamluk army at another time in the Battle of the Pyramids, where Napoleon Bonaparte defeated Murad Bey’s army again in this decisive battle on July 21, 1798.

Notable people
Souad Zuhair

References

Populated places in Beheira Governorate